Hillcrest is an unincorporated community in Center Township, Porter County, in the U.S. state of Indiana.

History
Hillcrest was laid out in 1914. The name of the community is descriptive of its location.

Geography

References

Unincorporated communities in Porter County, Indiana
Unincorporated communities in Indiana